Mieczysław Dziemieszkiewicz, ps. Rój (25 January 192514 April 1951) was a Soldier of the National Armed Forces (Poland) and the National Military Union in Poland, an anti-communist activist of the Polish underground in northern Mazovia.

Early life
Mieczysław Dziemieszkiewicz was born on January 25, 1925, in Zagroby, Podlaskie Voivodeship, Poland. Son of Adam and Stephanie from Świerdzewskich. In 1939 he graduated from public school in Rozan. During the occupation, he attended secret teaching courses in Makow Mazowiecki, while working at the German transport company.

World War II
In the spring of 1945 Dziemieszkiewicz was drafted into Reserve Infantry Regiment 1 in Warsaw, where he heard the news of the death of his brother, who was murdered during a robbery by Soviet soldiers in November 1945. He then deserted his post and fled. Soon after he joined the National Armed Forces-National Military Union branch led by Marian Kraśniewski "Burza (Tempest)", where he got his nickname "Rój (Swarm)". Initially, he was a link between the command of the district and the command of the county. In 1948 he was promoted to the rank of Sergeant. By order of the company commander Marian Koźniewski "Walter", in response to the mass arrests ordered by the Ministry of Public Security, Rój formed the Extraordinary Special Actions unit (Pogotowie Akcji Specjalnej), which he became the head of. As commander of the new unit, he began to carry out many actions against the communists, their special forces and agents.

Death
Dziemieszkiewicz's death was caused by his fiancee. The Ministry of Public Security were holding her parents in custody and she was forced to give up the whereabouts of Rój. He was killed when he tried to escape from the authorities. Dziemieszkiewicz's struggle against the communists was depicted in the 2016 Polish film, Historia Roja.

See also
Polish contribution to World War II

References

1925 births
1951 deaths
Polish people of World War II